Alhambra is the cancelled Xbox Live Arcade version of the popular board game designed by Dirk Henn for the Xbox 360, and developed by Vivendi Games, and was to be the third designer board game to be released on Arcade, the first two being Catan and Carcassonne.

The game was cancelled by Vivendi "due to unforeseen difficulties", though it may yet be revived with a new publisher.

References

External links 
GameSpot profile page

Video games based on board games
Cancelled Xbox 360 games